The 1979 World Junior Ice Hockey Championships (1979 WJHC) was the third edition of the Ice Hockey World Junior Championship and was held from 27 December 1978 until 3 January 1979. The tournament was held in Karlstad and Karlskoga, Sweden.  The Soviet Union won its third consecutive gold medal, while Czechoslovakia won the silver, and Sweden the bronze.

Pool A
The 1979 tournament divided participants into two divisions of four teams, each playing three games.  The top two teams in each division advanced to the championship round, while the bottom two were placed in the consolation round.  Each division played another round robin.  The top three teams in the championship round won the gold, silver and bronze medals.  In the consolation round, the results between teams that faced each other in the preliminary round carried over.

Final standings
This is the aggregate standings, ordered according to final placing.  The four teams in the championship round were ranked one through four, while the four teams in the consolation round were ranked five through eight regardless of overall record.

 was relegated to Pool B for the 1980 World Junior Ice Hockey Championships.

Preliminary round

Gold group

Blue group

Consolation round
Results from any games played during the preliminary round were carried forward to the consolation round.

Championship round

Scoring leaders

Tournament awards

Pool B
A second tier of the World Junior Championship was contested in Caen, France, from 5 to 9 March 1979.  Two groups of four played round robins, followed by placement games where 1st played 1st, etc..  This is the first year a B pool was contested for the under 20s.

Preliminary round

Group A

Group B

Final round

7th place game

5th place game

3rd place game

1st place game

 was promoted to Pool A for the 1980 World Junior Ice Hockey Championships.

References

 
1977–81 World Junior Hockey Championships at TSN
 Results at passionhockey.com
Stats at eliteprospects.com

World Junior Ice Hockey Championships
World Junior Ice Hockey Championships
International ice hockey competitions hosted by Sweden
World Junior Ice Hockey Championships
World Junior Ice Hockey
World Junior Ice Hockey
Sports competitions in Karlstad
World Junior Ice Hockey
Sport in Caen
International ice hockey competitions hosted by France
1978–79 in French ice hockey